Bugasong, officially the Municipality of Bugasong, is a 3rd class municipality in the province of Antique, Philippines. According to the 2020 census, it has a population of 34,676 people. Making it 8th most populous municipality in the province of Antique and fourth largest municipality in terms of land area, with a total area of 203.71 square kilometers.

Geography

According to the Philippine Statistics Authority, the municipality has a land area of  constituting  of the  total area of Antique. 
Bugasong has two largest river's Paliwan River  and Kangaranan River . Bugasong has many highest peaks Mount Baloy  and Mount Balabag .

Climate

Barangays
Bugasong is politically subdivided into 27 barangays. Ilaures and Cubay Sur were sitios converted into barrios in 1957 and 1959, respectively.

Demographics

In the 2020 census, Bugasong had a population of 34,676.

Bugasongnons speak Kinaray-a as their main dialect while Hiligaynon is used as their secondary dialect.

Economy

Government
The current mayor of the town is John Lloyd Pacete with Bernard Pesayco as vice mayor. The town council is composed of ten members, eight are elected at large, while two are elected after the barangay elections. The current town council members are:

 Casimira de la Cruz
 Aida Uy Kimpang
 Gerardo Antoy
 Susan Escote
 Geraldine Pesayco
 Roberto Fruto
 Cyril Pesayco
 Renante Dava
 Krizel Joy Panaguiton (SK Municipal Federation President)
 Norma Sayon (Liga ng mga Barangay)

Tourism

The town celebrates its annual town fiesta every 18 January in honor of Santo Niño (the Holy Child). The local town festival, the Bugas Sa Lusong, is integrated with this celebration, with its opening salvo sometime between 10 and 12 January. The highlight of the celebration is the high mass on 18 January, usually celebrated by the diocesan bishop and visiting priests.

The patadyong, a colorful native fabric, is a well-known product made by the locals in barangay Bagtason.

The Estaca Hills historically served as the town's watch tower. Currently, it is a destination for hiking. From the top, one can see the entirety of Bugasong.

Education
The town is the location of the only Dominican school in the province of Antique, Saint Joseph Academy, which was established on 1957. The school is run by the Dominican Sisters of the Most Holy Rosary of the Philippines. Notable alumni include former Deputy Ombudsman for the Visayas Atty. Pelagio Apostol and then National Artist Edsel Moscoso. Rex Francis Z. Ynion, a Council Scout Executive of the Boy Scouts of the Philippines, Metro Manila South Council which has jurisdiction to the Cities of Las Pinas, Taguig, Muntinlupa and Municipality of Pateros.

Other schools in the town include: Antique Vocational School, at the town proper; Northern Bugasong National School at barangay Cubay North; Southern Bugasong National School at barangay Igbalangao and Eastern Bugasong National High School (formerly Northern Bugasong National High School-Annex) at barangay Pangalcagan.

Gallery

References

External links

 [ Philippine Standard Geographic Code]
 Bugasong Online

Municipalities of Antique (province)